The 2022–23 season is Željezničar's 102nd in existence and their 23rd season in the Premier League BH. Besides competing in the domestic league, the team is also competing in the National Cup.

Season review

June
On 8 June, Željezničar announced the signing of 20-year-old Clarismario Santos.

On 15 June, Željezničar announced the signing of 27-year-old Dženan Haračić. The club also extended their sponsorship agreement with General Logistic.

On 18 June, Željezničar and Haris Hajdarević negotiated a one-year contract extension lasting until June 2023.

On 20 June, Željezničar announced the signing of 24-year-old Stjepan Vego. The club also negotiated contract extensions with Nedim Mekić and Amar Drina.

On 21 June, Željezničar announced the signing of 26-year-old Dženis Beganović.

On 23 June, Željezničar and Armin Hodžić negotiated a contract extension.

On 27 June, Željezničar and Omar Beća negotiated a contract extension. The club also announced that Edis Kovačević had become its new chairman of the board and that businessman Eldin Diglisić was selected as Željezničar's strategic partner.

July
On 1 July, Željezničar and Marin Galić negotiated a three-year contract extension lasting until July 2025. The club also negotiated a one-year contract extension with Edin Cocalić, lasting until July 2023.

On 4 July, Željezničar announced Edin Ćurić as the club's new director of its youth academy.

On 31 July, Željezničar announced the signing of 20-year-old Joseph Amoah.

December
On 20 December, Željezničar announced the departure of Sedad Subašić.

January
On 11 January, Željezničar announced the departure of Stjepan Vego. The club also signed a partnership agreement with Al-Hana Pharmacy.

On 18 January, Željezničar announced the signing of 27-year-old Irfan Jašarević.

On 19 January, Željezničar announced the signing of 20-year-old Andrija Drljo.

February
On 1 February, Željezničar announced the departure of Luka Malić.

On 4 February, Željezničar announced the signing of 32-year-old Sulejman Krpić.

On 10 February, Željezničar announced the signing of 28-year-old Armin Hodžić.

On 13 February, Željezničar extended their sponsorship agreement with Telemach.

Squad information

Players

Disciplinary record
Includes all competitive matches and only players that got booked throughout the season. The list is sorted by shirt number, and then position.

Squad statistics

Goalscorers

Assists

Clean sheets

Transfers

Players in

Total expenditure:  €0

Players out

Total income:  €
Net:  €

Club

Coaching staff
{|
|valign="top"|

Other information

Sponsorship

|-

Competitions

Pre-season

Mid-season

Overall

Premijer Liga BiH

League table

Results summary

Results by round

Matches

Kup BiH

Round of 32

Round of 16

Quarter-finals

Semi-finals

Notes

References

External links

FK Željezničar Sarajevo seasons
Zeljeznicar